This is a list of schools in Torbay in the English county of Devon.

State-funded schools

Primary schools

All Saints Babbacombe CE Primary School, Torquay
Barton Hill Academy, Torquay
Brixham CE Primary School, Brixham
Cockington Community Primary School, Torquay
Collaton St Mary CE Primary School, Paignton
Curledge Street Academy, Paignton
Eden Park Primary School, Brixham
Ellacombe CE Academy, Torquay
Furzeham Primary School, Brixham
Galmpton CE Primary School, Brixham
Hayes School, Paignton
Homelands Primary School, Torquay
Ilsham CE Academy, Torquay
Kings Ash Academy, Paignton
Oldway Primary School, Paignton
Our Lady of the Angels RC Primary School, Torquay
Preston Primary School, Torquay
Priory RC Primary School, Torquay
Roselands Primary School, Paignton
Sacred Heart Catholic RC School, Paignton
Sherwell Valley Primary School, Torquay
Shiphay Learning Academy, Torquay
St Margaret Clitherow RC Primary School, Brixham
St Margaret's Academy, Torquay
St Marychurch CE Primary School, Torquay
St Michael's CE Academy, Paignton
Torre CE Academy, Torquay
Upton St James CE Primary School, Torquay
Warberry CE Academy, Torquay
Watcombe Primary School, Torquay
White Rock Primary School, Paignton

Non-selective secondary schools
Brixham College, Brixham
Paignton Academy, Paignton
St Cuthbert Mayne School, Torquay
The Spires College, Torquay
Torquay Academy, Torquay

Grammar schools
Churston Ferrers Grammar School, Brixham
The Spires College, Torquay
Torquay Boys' Grammar School, Torquay
Torquay Girls' Grammar School, Torquay

Special and alternative schools
The Brunel Academy, Paignton
The Burton Academy, Torquay
Combe Pafford School, Torquay
Mayfield School, Torquay

Further education
South Devon College, Paignton

Independent schools

Primary and preparatory schools
Abbey School, Torquay

Special and alternative schools
Phoenix Bay School, Torquay
Preston Bridge School, Paignton
TLG Torbay, Torquay

Sources

Torbay
Schools in Torbay